The 27th National Hockey League All-Star Game was held in the Chicago Stadium in Chicago, home of the Chicago Black Hawks, on January 29, 1974. It was the second time that the All-Star Game was held in Chicago. The East Division All-Stars defeated the West Division All-Stars 5–4. Garry Unger was named the game's most valuable player.

Team lineups 
Five East Division players selected for the game withdrew at the last minute. Bobby Orr was injured, Serge Savard was ordered to rest, Guy Lapointe was injured, Jacques Lemaire was injured, and Gilbert Perreault was injured. Red Berenson, Jocelyn Guevremont, Jim McKenny, Henri Richard and Larry Robinson were named as replacements.

Game summary 

Goaltenders : 
 East: Gilbert (29:59 minutes), Dryden (30:01 minutes).
 West: Parent (29:59 minutes), T. Esposito (30:01 minutes).

Shots on goal : 
 East (35) 15 -  10 -  10
 West (28)  8 - 8 - 12

Referee : Art Skov

Linesmen : Matt Pavelich, Willard Norris

Source: Podnieks

See also
1973–74 NHL season

References

 

All-Star
National Hockey League All-Star Games
National Hockey League All-Star Game
National Hockey League All-Star Game